Demo Anthology is a collection of hits and previously unreleased demos by the rock band Winger. The demo material is taken from recording sessions of the debut album Winger (1988) up to Pull (1993).

'Hour Of Need' was rewritten by the band, and eventually surfaced as 'In My Veins' on 'Pull'. 'Star Tripper' was reworked and was turned into 'Baptized By Fire' on "In The Heart Of The Young."
'Give Me More' was also rewritten, and eventually surfaced as 'Hell To Pay' on the Japanese version of 'Pull'. This track is also included on the 2001 compilation "The Very Best of Winger".

Track listing

Disc 1
 "Madalaine" – 4:20
 "Hungry" – 4:08
 "Seventeen" – 3:54 
 "State of Emergency" – 3:04 
 "Time to Surrender" – 4:14
 "Hangin' On" – 3:21
 "Headed for a Heartbreak" – 4:39
 "Only Love" – 3:29 *
 "Can't Get Enuff" – 3:47
 "Loosen Up" – 3:39
 "Miles Away" – 4:04
 "Easy Come Easy Go" – 3:26
 "Rainbow in the Rose" – 5:17
 "In the Day We'll Never See" – 3:29
 "Under One Condition" – 4:31
 "Little Dirty Blonde" – 3:39
 "Star Tripper" – 3:37 *
 "You Are the Saint, I Am the Sinner" – 3:19
 "In the Heart of the Young" – 3:42

Disc 2
 "All I Ever Wanted" – 3:30
 "Skin Tight" – 3:00 *
 "Someday Someway" – 4:15 *
 "Never" – 4:52
 "Blind Revolution Mad" – 5:47
 "Down Incognito" – 3:56
 "Spell I'm Under" – 3:42
 "Hour of Need" – 3:59 *
 "Junk Yard Dog" – 6:53 
 "The Lucky One" – 4:55
 "Like a Ritual" – 4:42
 "In for the Kill" – 4:35
 "No Man's Land" – 3:30
 "Who's the One" – 4:53
 "Written in the Wind" – 4:10 *
 "Until There Was You" – 3:10 *
 "Without Warning" – 2:57 *
 "Give Me More" – 3:10 *
 "Just Another Face" - 3:32 (Japanese release bonus track) *

 * Previously unreleased tracks

Personnel 
 Kip Winger – bass guitar, lead vocals, keyboards, and acoustic guitar.
 Reb Beach – lead & rhythm guitars, and backing vocals.
 Paul Taylor – keyboards, rhythm guitar, effects, and backing vocals.
 Rod Morgenstein – drums, percussion, and backing vocals.

Winger (band) albums
2007 compilation albums
Demo albums
Cleopatra Records compilation albums